The 2016 Big East Conference baseball tournament was held at Leidos Field at Ripken Stadium in Aberdeen, Maryland from May 26 through 29. The event, held at the end of the conference regular season, determined the champion of the Big East Conference for the 2016 season. Xavier won the double-elimination tournament and received the conference's automatic bid to the 2016 NCAA Division I baseball tournament.

Format and seeding
The tournament will use a double-elimination format and feature the top four finishers of the Big East's seven teams.

Bracket

References

Tournament
Big East Conference Baseball Tournament
Big East Conference baseball tournament
Big East Conference baseball tournament
Aberdeen, Maryland
College sports tournaments in Maryland
Baseball competitions in Maryland
Tourist attractions in Harford County, Maryland